Dharam Veer may refer to:
Dharam Veer (film), a 1977 Bollywood film, directed by Manmohan Desai.
Dharam Veer (TV series), an Indian period drama.